The Tini Tour 2022 (stylized in all caps) is the third concert tour by Argentine singer Tini, in support of her third and fourth studio albums Tini Tini Tini (2020) and Cupido (2023). The tour began on May 20, 2022, in Buenos Aires at Hipódromo de Palermo. It also included some festival concerts and pre-tour concerts as part of Tini Tini Tini Show in Argentina, Chile and Bolivia. The tour was originally set to begin in March 2022, but due to Tini's father's health issues and hospitalization, the entire tour was postponed to start in May of the same year.

The concerts on May 28, at Hipódromo and December 22-23, 2022, at Campo Argentino de Polo were broadcast live on Star+ platform, exclusively in Latin America, and on Disney+ in the United States. The first one was released under the title TINI Tour 2022: Live from Buenos Aires (Spanish: "TINI Tour 2022: En Vivo desde Buenos Aires"), and the second one under the title Tini Tour 2022: Farewell of the Year (Spanish: "Tini Tour 2022: La Despedida del Año").

Background 
After two years absent due to the COVID-19 pandemic and having left the closing of her previous tour, Quiero Volver Tour, unfinished, Tini resumes live performances. On her interrupted and unfinished tour, she manage to present most of the songs from her third studio album Tini Tini Tini, and she planned to do a brand new tour for the album, unfortunately due to the pandemic she was not able to do it. On November 11, 2021, Tini shared via her social media that she is embarking on her third solo tour, and that the tour starts on March 21, 2022, in her home country Argentina at the Hipódromo de Palermo.

The tickets for the show went on sale the same day she confirmed the tour. Tickets sold out in minutes, and then she added four more concerts in a row on 24, 25, 26 and 27 March 2022, at the Hipódromo, that also sold out in minutes. During the months of January and February 2022, a series of concerts were held prior to the official start of the tour. In these, the Argentine singer toured various festivals and gave concerts in Argentina, Chile and Bolivia.

On March 10, 2022, Tini announced that the concerts at the Hipodromo are postponed to May due to her father's health issues and hospitalization. With this tour, Tini became the first female artist to ever sold out 6  Hipódromo de Palermo concerts, as well as the only Argentine artist to sold out a stadium after 20 years.

Concert synopsis 

Almost fifteen minutes before the show started, a countdown timer and video projected on a giant curtain placed at the back of the stage for the Tini's appearance on her room of teen aesthetic. Then the band started with some chords until Tini appeared to the top of the stage where a drummer was waiting for her. She then started playing the drums for the into of the song, while platform slowly moved down to the stage. Immediately, Tini began to sing “Te Quiero Más” and, accompanied by her dancers, the artist had the first approach to the public. During Nacho's verses, Tini took the opportunity to join the choreography.

The next song in the repertoire was “Quiero Volver”, which she released with her former partner Sebastián Yatra. This single went viral on social networks, mainly on TikTok, thanks to the choreography they created for the tour. Next “Suéltate el Pelo” arrived with fire, and Tini, as she has been doing in the concerts of her tour, added a new verse to the song. Tini continued with “Duele” and was also encouraged to present some sensual steps of what we could call tango, together with her dancer Camila Lucca.

And in this way, Tini continued with “Recuerdo”. During the first verses of the song, the production was in charge of launching fireworks into the sky. Unlike other artists, Tini -in those songs that are her collaborations- does not cut the fragment of her companions in the version that she presents in her concerts, but rather takes advantage of those seconds to join the choreography of the her dancers. Meanwhile, “Maldita Foto” and “2:50 Remix” were the next to play.

The singer went ‘backstage’ for a moment and returned with a costume change, which meant the beginning of the fragment of the show dedicated to romantic ballads that -according to what she confessed at the concert- she will never stop doing. Then "Por Que Te Vas" followed. After this“ Oye” was the song that allowed her to get off the stage to interact closely with her fans located in the front row. Then she sang rest of her ballads like "Un Beso en Madrid", "Acércate", "Carne y Hueso" and "Consejo de Amor".  A new costume change and, Tini came on stage with a phosphorescent green suit to the rhythm of electronic music. “Ella Dice”, “Playa”, “High Remix” and “Fresa”, songs whose melody was slightly modified, were the next ones on the playlist that the artist had prepared for that night. Later, pink would take over the stage with the new two-piece set full of diamonds that Tini wore. The she started to singing her part of “Fantasí”.

In her latest video clips, Tini included short and simple choreographies that can be replicated on TikTok and, in this way, make her songs go viral. The objective was fulfilled. That is why it was not a surprise when, while the artist sang “La Triple T”, some of the attendees were encouraged to follow the trend. Next was "Bar" and "22", with colorfull effects around the stage. The last song of the concert was “Miénteme”, and after performing, Tini thanks the audience as confetti and fireworks came off the stage after Tini left. After the show, the pink tide dissolved on the outskirts.

Set list 
This set list is representative of the concert on February 2, 2023. It does not represent all concerts for the duration of the tour.

Act 1
 "22"
 "Quiero Volver"
 "Suéltate El Pelo" 
 "Duele"
 "El Último Beso"
 "Maldita Foto"
 "2:50 (Remix)"
Act 2
 "Por Que Te Vas"
 "Oye"
 "Un Beso en Madrid"
 "Por el Resto de Tu Vida" 
 "Carne y Hueso"
 "Acércate"
Act 3
 "Ella Dice" (with elements of "Rakata" by Wisin & Yandel and "La Noche de Anoche" by Bad Bunny and Rosalía)
 "High (Remix)"
 "Fresa" (with elements of "Faded" by Alan Walker)
Act 4
 "Fantasi"
 "La Triple T"
 "Muñecas"
 "La Loto"
 "Bar"
 "Miénteme"

Tour dates

Notes

References

2022 concert tours
2023 concert tours
Martina Stoessel concert tours
Concert tours of South America
Concert tours of Europe